eLong is a Chinese mobile and online travel agency, which runs the eponymous eLong.com and eLong.net travel website.

References

Chinese travel websites
Chinese companies established in 1999
Transport companies established in 1999
Internet properties established in 1999
2004 initial public offerings
Online companies of China
Travel and holiday companies of China
Online travel agencies
Companies formerly listed on the Nasdaq
Companies based in Beijing